Baldpate Mountain is a mountain located in Oxford County, Maine.

Baldpate is flanked to the north by Surplus Mountain, to the northeast by Black Mountain, and to the southeast by Mount Hittie. To the southwest, Baldpate Mountain faces Old Speck Mountain across Grafton Notch, which by convention marks the northeast end of the Mahoosuc Range.

Baldpate Mountain is within the watershed of the Androscoggin River, which drains into Merrymeeting Bay, the estuary of the Kennebec River, and then into the Gulf of Maine. The northwest side of Baldpate Mountain drains into the Swift Cambridge River, then into the Dead Cambridge River and Umbagog Lake, the source of the Androscoggin River. The southeast and southwest sides of Baldpate drain into the Bear River, then into the Androscoggin. The northeast side of Baldpate Mtn. drains into the West Branch of the Ellis River, then into the Androscoggin.

The Appalachian Trail, a  National Scenic Trail from Georgia to Maine, runs from Grafton Notch to Surplus Mountain across both peaks of Baldpate.

See also
 List of mountains in Maine
 New England Hundred Highest
 New England Fifty Finest

References

Mountains of Oxford County, Maine
Mountains on the Appalachian Trail
New England Hundred Highest